Otonality and utonality are terms introduced by Harry Partch to describe chords whose pitch classes are the harmonics or subharmonics of a given fixed tone (identity), respectively.

Definition 

An otonality is a collection of pitches which can be expressed in ratios, expressing their relationship to the fixed tone, that have equal denominators and consecutive numerators. This in turn can be written as an extended ratio 4:5:6. Every otonality is therefore composed of members of a harmonic series. Similarly, the ratios of a utonality share the same numerator and have consecutive denominators. Every utonality is therefore composed of members of a subharmonic series. This term is used extensively by Harry Partch in Genesis of a Music.

An otonality corresponds to an arithmetic series of frequencies, or lengths of a vibrating string. Brass instruments naturally produce otonalities, and indeed otonalities are inherent in the harmonics of a single fundamental tone. Tuvan Khoomei singers produce otonalities with their vocal tracts.

Utonality is the opposite, corresponding to a subharmonic series of frequencies, or an arithmetic series of wavelengths (the inverse of frequency). The arithmetical proportion "may be considered as a demonstration of utonality ('minor tonality')."

If otonality and utonality are defined broadly, every just intonation chord is both an otonality and a utonality. A better, narrower definition requires that the harmonic (or subharmonic) series members be adjacent. Thus 4:5:6 is an otonality, but 10:12:15 is not. (Alternate voicings of 4:5:6, such as 5:6:8, 3:4:5:6, etc. would presumably also be otonalities.) Under this definition, only a few chord types qualify as otonalities or utonalities. The only otonality triads are the major triad 4:5:6 and the diminished triad 5:6:7. The only such tetrad is the dominant seventh tetrad 4:5:6:7.

Microtonalists have extended the concept of otonal and utonal to apply to all just intonation chords. A chord is otonal if its odd limit increases on being melodically inverted, utonal if its odd limit decreases, and ambitonal if its odd limit is unchanged. Melodic inversion is not inversion in the usual sense, in which C–E–G becomes E–G–C or G–C–E. Instead, C–E–G is turned upside down to become C–A–F. A chord's odd limit is the largest of the odd limits of each of the numbers in the chord's extended ratio. For example, the major triad in close position is 4:5:6. These three numbers have odd limits of 1, 5 and 3 respectively. The largest of the three is 5, thus the chord has an odd limit of 5. Its melodic inverse 10:12:15 has an odd limit of 15, which is greater, therefore the major triad is otonal. A chord's odd limit is independent of its voicing, so alternate voicings such as 5:6:8, 3:4:5:6, etc. are also otonal.

All otonalities are otonal, but not all otonal chords are otonalities. Likewise, all utonalities are a subset of utonal chords.

The major ninth chord 8:10:12:15:18 is also otonal. Examples of ambitonal chords are the major sixth chord (12:15:18:20) and the major seventh chord (8:10:12:15). Ambitonal chords often can be reasonably interpreted as either major or minor. For example, CM6, in certain contexts or voicings, can be interpreted as Am7.

Relationship to standard Western music theory 

Partch said that his 1931 coinage of "otonality" and "utonality" was "hastened" by having read Henry Cowell's discussion of undertones in New Musical Resources (1930).

The 5-limit otonality is simply a just major chord, and the 5-limit utonality is a just minor chord. Thus otonality and utonality can be viewed as extensions of major and minor tonality respectively. However, whereas standard music theory views a minor chord as being built up from the root with a minor third and a perfect fifth, a utonality is viewed as descending from what's normally considered the "fifth" of the chord, so the correspondence is not perfect. This corresponds with the dualistic theory of Hugo Riemann:

In the era of meantone temperament, augmented sixth chords of the kind known as the German sixth (or the English sixth, depending on how it resolves) were close in tuning and sound to the 7-limit otonality, called the tetrad. This chord might be, for example, A-C-E-G[F] . Standing alone, it has something of the sound of a dominant seventh, but considerably less dissonant. It has also been suggested that the Tristan chord, for example, F-B-D-G can be considered a utonality, or 7-limit utonal tetrad, which it closely approximates if the tuning is meantone, though presumably less well in the tuning of a Wagnerian orchestra.

Whereas 5-limit chords associate otonal with major and utonal with minor, 7-limit chords that don't use 5 as a prime factor reverse this association. For example, 6:7:9 is otonal but minor, and 14:18:21 is utonal but major.

Consonance 

Though Partch presents otonality and utonality as being equal and symmetric concepts, when played on most physical instruments an otonality sounds much more consonant than a similar utonality, due to the presence of the missing fundamental phenomenon. In an otonality, all of the notes are elements of the same harmonic series, so they tend to partially activate the presence of a "virtual" fundamental as though they were harmonics of a single complex pitch. Utonal chords, while containing the same dyads and roughness as otonal chords, do not tend to activate this phenomenon as strongly. There are more details in Partch's work.

Use

Partch used otonal and utonal chords in his music. Ben Johnston often uses the otonal as an expanded tonic chord: 4:5:6:7:11:13 (C:E:G:B:F:A) and bases the opening of the third movement of his String Quartet No. 10 on this thirteen-limit Otonality on C. The mystic chord has been theorized as being derived from harmonics 8 through 14 without 12: 8:9:10:11:13:14 (C:D:E:F:A:B), and as harmonics 7 through 13: 7:8:9:10:(11:)12:13 (C:D:E:F:(G:)A:B); both otonal. Yuri Landman published a microtonal diagram that compares series of otonal and utonal scales with 12TET and the harmonic series. He applies this system for just transposition with a set of electric microtonal kotos.

See also 
Scale of harmonics
Tonality flux
Tonality diamond

References

External links
Otonality and ADO system at 96-EDO
Utonality and EDL system at 96-EDO

Harmony
Harry Partch
Pitch (music)
Musical tuning